The National Association of Old IRA was a commemorative organisation made up of members of the Old IRA as opposed to the then current IRA, which was as now a proscribed organisation.

They marched in 1939 in a commemoration of the War of Independence.

Aims
As with other veterans organisations, they looked for the welfare of members, organising pensions, etc., and commemorating their fallen and battles and events of significance to membership.

References

Irish Republican Army (1919–1922)
Defunct organisations based in Ireland
Irish veterans' organisations